Lesbian, gay, bisexual, and transgender (LGBT) persons in  Togo face legal challenges not experienced by non-LGBT residents. Both male and female same-sex sexual activity is illegal in Togo.

Law regarding same-sex sexual activity
While it was the German Empire protectorate Togoland, same-sex sexual activity was made illegal in 1884. The German Empire lost control of Togoland in 1916.

Same-sex sexual activity is illegal in present-day Togo via the Penal Code of 13 August 1980, with a penalty of one to three years imprisonment and a fine of 100,000 to 500,000 CFA francs.

Adoption of children
According to a website of the French government, single and married people are eligible to adopt children. The website does not say whether LGBT people are disqualified.

Living conditions
No law protects persons from discrimination based on sexual orientation or gender identity.

The U.S. Department of State's 2011 human rights report found that,

The law provides that a person who engages in a consensual same-sex sexual act may be punished by one to three years' imprisonment and fined 100,000 to 500,000 CFA francs ($208 to $1,041). There were no prosecutions [in 2011] for homosexuality or the often related charge of indecent assault. The eight persons arrested for same-sex sexual conduct in 2010 remained incarcerated. Societal discrimination based on sexual orientation and gender identity occurred, and there were no known lesbian, gay, bisexual, and transgender organizations.

Summary table

See also

Human rights in Togo
LGBT rights in Africa

Notes

References

Human rights in Togo
Togo
LGBT in Togo